Meilen District is one of the twelve districts of the German-speaking canton of Zurich, Switzerland. It lies to the south of the canton in the Pfannenstiel region, forming much of the northern shore of Lake Zurich. The district capital is the town of Meilen.

Municipalities 
Meilen contains a total of eleven municipalities:

References

Districts of the canton of Zürich